William Howison or Howieson ARSA (1798-1850) was a Scottish engraver of note in the early 19th century.

Life

He was born in Edinburgh and educated at George Heriot's School.

He was originally apprenticed to an engraver named Wilson and later worked under William Home Lizars.

David Octavius Hill introduced him to Sir George Harvey, after which point he reproduced many of Harvey's paintings in engraved form. He gained particular notoriety for his engraving The Curlers which led to his acceptance into the Royal Scottish Academy, the only engraver admitted.

In the 1830s he is listed as living and working at 227 High Street on Edinburgh's Royal Mile.

He died on 20 December 1850 at 8 Frederick Street, Edinburgh, and is buried in Greyfriars Kirkyard in the centre of Edinburgh with his widow Jane Scott (1801-1871) and children. The grave lies in the northern half of the graveyard, towards the west side, against the sunken vault.

Works
The Curlers (1838)
The Covenanters' Communion
A Schule Skailin
The First Letter from the Emigrants (after Thomas Faed RA)

References

People educated at George Heriot's School
Scottish engravers
1798 births
1850 deaths
Royal Scottish Academicians
Artists from Edinburgh
Burials at Greyfriars Kirkyard